Bottrill is an English surname. Notable people with the surname include:

 Allan Bottrill (1905–1929), English footballer, brother of Billy
 Billy Bottrill (Walter Gibson Bottrill) (1903–1986), English footballer
 David Bottrill, Canadian record producer
 Frank Bottrill (1871–1953), Australian blacksmith and inventor
 Pat Bottrill, English nurse
 William Bottrill (1892–1971), English-born Canadian WWI flying ace

See also
 Bottrill Head, headland in Antarctica
 Botterill

English-language surnames